Diplopeltoididae is a family of nematodes belonging to the order Leptolaimida.

Genera:
 Diplopeltoides Gerlach, 1962

References

Nematodes